The 2014 edition of the UNAF U-17 Tournament took place between 21 and 23 March 2014. Morocco hosted the tournament.

Participants
 (host)

Venues
 Stade Moulay Hassan, Rabat (15,000)
 Stade Municipal, Temara (5,000)

Knockout stage
All times given as local time (UTC+0)

Final

Champions

References 

2014 in African football
2014
2014